Carchesium is a genus of usually colonial peritrich ciliates in the Vorticellidae with a spirally contractile stalk. The inverted bell-shaped cells have an oral lip as in Epistylis

The genus has a cosmopolitan diribution in freshwater and is a common part of the fauna of the aerobic stages of waste water treatment plants, such as activated sludge and trickling filters.

References

Oligohymenophorea
Ciliate genera
Taxa named by Christian Gottfried Ehrenberg